Eugenia myrcianthes (synonym Hexachlamys edulis) or ubajay is a species of plant in the family Myrtaceae found in Argentina, Bolivia, Brazil, Paraguay and Uruguay.

Description
Eugenia myrcianthe is a densely branched tree with dark and sealed bark, reaching 4 to 8 m in height. The leaves are globose, with evergreen foliage. They are simple, opposite, with the pubescent petiole, from ovate-oblong to lanceolate, acuminate, 3 to 6 cm long; Coriaceous, show pubescence when young and becoming glabrous with age.

It blooms in early spring. Flowers are typical of myrtaceae; Appearing in the leaf axils, and are white, solitary with up to fifty stamens. About two months later it produces fruits, producing a globose and yellow color fruit, of up to 5 cm of diameter. It tastes similar to peach (Prunus persica) giving  its vulgar name of peach tree. The fruit is edible, with the orange pulp, very juicy, slightly tart aftertaste when fully ripe.

References

Flora of South America
myrcianthes